Procedural may refer to:

Procedural generation, a term used in computer graphics applications
Procedural knowledge, the knowledge exercised in the performance of some task
Procedural law, a legal concept
Procedural memory, a cognitive science concept
Procedural programming, a computer programming concept
Procedural (genre), a type of literature, film, or television program involving a sequence of technical detail. For example:
Police procedural, a subgenre of detective fiction
Procedural drama, a genre of television programming
Procedural democracy, a democracy focussing on (electoral) procedures

See also 
 Procedure (disambiguation)